Roger Westbrook  (born 26 May 1941), was a diplomat and formerly the British High Commissioner to Brunei, Tanzania and Ambassador to Zaire.

Biography

Early life 
Westbrook was born on 26 May 1941 and educated at Dulwich College and Hertford College.

Diplomatic career 
Westbrook's diplomatic career began after he began work with the Foreign Office as a Grade 5 Officer on 7 August 1964, later be promoted to Grade 9 Officer. In 1965, he became the Assistant Private Secretary to the Chancellory of the Duchy of Lancaster. From 1967 to 1970, he was posted to Yaoundé, Cameroon, and later Rio de Janeiro, Brazil in 1971. Transferred to the Foreign and Commonwealth Office (FCO) as their Private Secretary to the Minister of State in 1975, and Head of Chancery in Lisbon in 1977. 

In 1980, he became the Deputy Head of News of State, and Deputy Head of the Falkland Islands Department in 1982. By 1984, he was an Overseas Inspector. On 27 October 1986, he gave his credential to Sultan Hassanal Bolkiah at the Istana Nurul Iman, therefore replacing Francis Cornish as the new high commissioner. He would hold that position until 1991, where he was reappointed as the Ambassador to Zaire. From 1992 to 1995, he was appointed as the high commissioner to Tanzania.

Honours 
  Order of St Michael and St George Companion (CMG) – (1990)

References

1941 births
People educated at Dulwich College
Alumni of Hertford College, Oxford
Companions of the Order of St Michael and St George
High Commissioners of the United Kingdom to Brunei
Ambassadors of the United Kingdom to the Democratic Republic of the Congo
High Commissioners of the United Kingdom to Tanzania